Drmno (Serbian Cyrillic: Дрмно) is a village in the municipality of Požarevac, Serbia, around 60 km east of Belgrade. According to the 2002 census, the village has a population of 1046 people.

References

Populated places in Braničevo District